The Edel 665 is a French sailboat, that was designed by Maurice Edel and first built in 1984. It was marketed as the Edel 660 in France and is sometimes referred to as the Edel 6.

Production
The design was built by Construction Nautic Edel in France and also at its Canadian subsidiary, Edel Canada. Between 1975 and 1984 a total of 900 examples were completed.

Design

The Edel 665 is a small recreational keelboat, built predominantly of fiberglass, with mahogany wood trim. It has a fractional sloop rig, a raked stem, a vertical transom, a skeg-mounted spade-type rudder controlled by a tiller and a fixed fin keel. It displaces  and carries  of ballast.

The boat is normally fitted with a small outboard motor for docking and maneuvering.

Features include a lifting eye on the keel to facilitate winching the boat in and out of the water with a crane, opening foredeck hatch, a mainsheet traveller and genoa tracks. Accommodations can sleep four people on a "V"-berth, a convertible settee and quarter berth. Factory options included jibsheet winches, a hydraulic "pop-top", a recirculating head and a spinnaker.

Operational history
The design was named Boat of the Year at the Paris Boat Show.

See also
List of sailing boat types

Related development
Edel 540

Similar sailboats
Alberg 22
Buccaneer 220
Cape Dory 22
Capri 22
CS 22
DS-22
Falmouth Cutter 22
Hunter 22
J/22
Marlow-Hunter 22
Marshall 22
Nonsuch 22
Pearson Electra
Pearson Ensign
Ranger 22
Santana 22
Seaward 22
Spindrift 22
Starwind 223
Tanzer 22
Triton 22
US Yachts US 22

References

External links

Official brochure

Keelboats
1970s sailboat type designs
Sailing yachts
Sailboat type designs by Maurice Edel
Sailboat types built by Edel